Naughty Grandma is a 2017 Russian comedy film directed by Maryus Vaysberg. It stars Aleksandr Revva and Glukoza. The film was the only domestic picture to be successful at the Russian box-office in the summer of 2017.

Plot 
Aleksandr Rubenstein (Sanya), nicknamed the Transformer, has the talent of impersonating various people. He uses this skill for criminal purposes. After another successful case, Sanya is forced to hide from his pursuers in his uncle's nursing home, posing as a grandmother. There he meets a girl, Lyuba, and falls in love, but a grandfather from the nursing home unexpectedly falls in love with him.

Cast
Aleksandr Revva - Aleksandr Rubenstein (Sanya) / Aleksandra Pavlovna Fishman
Glukoza - Lyuba
Evgeniy Gerchakov - Uncle
Vladimir Tolokonnikov - Bessonov
Marina Fedunkiv - Nurse Tonya
Natalia Bardo - Accomplice Aleksandra Viktoria
Yelena Valyushkina - Head
Yola Sanko - Amnesiac
Svetlana Sukhanova - Masha
Lyubov Revva - Aunt Raya
Daniil Fyodorov - Artist
Aleksandr Lyrchikov - Lavryonov
Elena Rubina - Pelageya
Gamlet Petrosyan - Gamlet
Gennadiy Makoyev - Colonel Kulagin
Nina Slavnova - Pelageya
Nikolai Ivanov - Oligarchs assistant
Philipp Kirkorov - Himself (cameo)

Production
The idea of the film belongs to Aleksandr Revva. About twenty stuntmen were involved in the making of the film. The makeup for Aleksandr Revva's grandmother character took 4 hours daily to apply.

Reception
The film received generally negative reviews in Russian media.

References

External links 
 

Films directed by Maryus Vaysberg
2017 films
2010s Russian-language films
2017 black comedy films
Cross-dressing in film
Russian black comedy films